The Jazz Skyline is an album by American jazz vibraphonist Milt Jackson featuring performances recorded in 1956 and released on the Savoy label.

Reception
The Allmusic review by Bob Rusch states: "This session has interest as an example of Milt Jackson's mid-'50s work in a non-Modern Jazz Quartet context. And despite the many critical assertions that the vibist was restrained by pianist John Lewis' direction, his playing here revealed no marked change".

Track listing
 "Lover" (Lorenz Hart, Richard Rodgers) - 7:45 
 "Can't Help Lovin' Dat Man" (Oscar Hammerstein II, Jerome Kern) - 4:35 
 "The Lady Is a Tramp" (Hart, Rodgers) - 7:18 
 "Angel Face" (Hank Jones) - 6:38 
 "Sometimes I'm Happy" (Irving Caesar, Vincent Youmans) - 7:15 
 "What's New?" (Johnny Burke, Bob Haggart) - 3:51

Personnel
Milt Jackson – vibes
Lucky Thompson - tenor saxophone
Hank Jones - piano
Wendell Marshall - bass
Kenny Clarke – drums

References 

Savoy Records albums
Milt Jackson albums
1956 albums